Miss Fortune may refer to:

Music
 Miss Fortune (band), an American band
 Miss Fortune (album), a 2002 album by Allison Moorer
 Miss Fortune (opera), an opera composed by Judith Weir
 "Miss Fortune", a song from the album Distance Inbetween by The Coral

Other
 "Miss Fortune", an episode of Ghost Whisperer
 Miss Fortune, a character from the video game League of Legends

See also  
MF (disambiguation)
Misfortune (disambiguation)